Back Road Paradise is the sixth studio album by Canadian folk music artist Jimmy Rankin. It was released on April 1, 2014 on Rankin's own Song Dog label and distributed by Fontana North. The album is more country than Rankin's previous releases. It features collaborations with Alison Krauss and Jim Cuddy. The first single released from the album was "Cool Car".

Critical reception
Doug Gallant of Ottawa at Home gave the album four stars out of five, writing that "Rankin's songwriting is so consistently strong throughout the record I would be hard pressed to point to anything on Back Road Paradise that I wouldn't put on a playlist." Doug Taylor of The Coast wrote that "the goal is to be on country radio all over, because with this album he deserves it." Ken Kelley of The Musicnerd Chronicles stated that "Rankin isn't as much about the bells and whistles and posturing as he is about delivering truly memorable songs, of which there are many."

Track listing

Chart performance

Singles

References

2014 albums
Jimmy Rankin albums